Cartesian Meditations: An Introduction to Phenomenology is a book by the philosopher Edmund Husserl, based on four lectures he gave at the Sorbonne, in the Amphithéatre Descartes on February 23 and 25, 1929. Over the next two years, he and his assistant Eugen Fink expanded and elaborated on the text of these lectures. These expanded lectures were first published in a 1931 French translation by Gabrielle Peiffer and Emmanuel Levinas with advice from Alexandre Koyré.  They were published in German, along with the original Pariser Vortrage, in 1950, and again in an English translation by Dorion Cairns in 1960, based on a typescript of the text (Typescript C) which Husserl had designated for Cairns in 1933.

The Cartesian Meditations were never published in German during Husserl's lifetime, a fact which has led some commentators to conclude that Husserl had become dissatisfied with the work in relation to its aim, namely an introduction to transcendental phenomenology. The text introduces the main features of Husserl's mature transcendental phenomenology, including (not exhaustively) the transcendental reduction, the epoché, static and genetic phenomenology, eidetic reduction, and eidetic phenomenology.  In the Fourth Meditation, Husserl argues that transcendental phenomenology is nothing other than transcendental idealism.
 
The name Cartesian Meditations refers to René Descartes' Meditations on First Philosophy. Thus Husserl wrote:

Contents
The work is divided into five "meditations" of varying length, whose contents are as follows:
First Meditation: The Way to the Transcendental Ego
Second Meditation: The Field of Transcendental Experience
Third Meditation: Constitutional Problems
Fourth Meditation: Constitutional Problems Pertaining to the Transcendental Ego Itself
Fifth Meditation: Transcendental Being as Monadological Intersubjectivity

Editions
 Meditations Cartesiennes: Introduction à la phenomenologie. 1931. Gabrielle Peiffer and Emmanuel Levinas, trans. Paris: Armand Collin.
 Meditations Cartesiennes: Introduction à la phenomenologie. 1947. Gabrielle Peiffer and Emmanuel Levinas, trans. Paris: Vrin.
Cartesian Meditations. 1960. Dorion Cairns, trans. The Hague: Martinus Nijhoff.

References
 Dermot Moran, Rodney K. B. Parker (eds.). 2016. Studia Phaenomenologica: Vol. XV / 2015. Early Phenomenology. Zeta Books. p. 150.

1931 non-fiction books
Books about René Descartes
Books by Edmund Husserl
Phenomenology literature